The Kyzylkum Desert (قىزىلقۇم; , قىزىلقۇم) is the 15th largest desert in the world. Its name means Red Sand in Turkic languages. It is located in Central Asia, in the land between the confluent rivers Amu Darya and Syr Darya, a region historically known as Transoxania. Today it is divided between Kazakhstan, Turkmenistan and Uzbekistan.

Geography

Most of the area is covered with dunes (barchans); in the northwest large areas are covered with takirs (clay coatings); there are also some oases. There are agricultural settlements along the rivers and in the oases. Temperatures can be very high during the summer months, from mid-May to mid-September. Kerki, one extreme inland city located on the banks of the Amu Darya River, recorded  in July 1983. It is mainly located in Uzbekistan.

Fauna

The saiga antelope (Saiga tatarica) also occasionally migrates through the northern part of the desert.

Kyzylkum Nature Reserve in Bukhara Region was established in 1971. Fauna include: Bactrian deer (Cervus elaphus bactrianus), wild boar (Sus scrofa), common pheasant (Phasianus colchicus), golden eagle (Aquila chrysaetus).

It is a breeding centre for rare species such as goitered gazelle (Gazella subgutturosa), Przewalski's horse (Equus ferus przewalskii), Turkmenian kulan (Equus hemionus kulan) and MacQueen's bustard (Chlamydotis macqueenii).

Paleontology

The Kyzylkum Desert has exposed rock formations that have yielded a number of fossils.  Of particular interest is the Bissekty Formation of Uzbekistan, from the early Late Cretaceous, which has produced several species of early birds: Incolornis martini, Explorornis walkeri, Kizylkumavis cretacea, Kuszholia mengi, Lenesornis kaskarovi, Sazavis prisca, Zhyraornis kaskarovi and Z. logunovi are recognized as valid species. Tyrannosaurid, therizinosaurid, ornithomimosaur, oviraptorosaurian, troodontid, ankylosaur, hadrosaur, and ceratopsian dinosaurs are also known from this rock unit. Other fossils from the Cretaceous rocks of the Kyzylkum include tree trunks, pelecypods, beetles, sharks, rays, bony fish, frogs, salamanders, turtles, crocodylomorphs, pterosaurs, and a varied fauna of small early mammals. Paleontologists that have worked in this area include J. David Archibald, Alexander Averianov, Sergei Kurzanov, Lev Nesov, Anatoly Riabinin, Anatoly Rozhdestvensky, and Hans-Dieter Sues.

Economy

The local population uses the large spaces of the Kyzylkum Desert as a pasture for livestock (mostly sheep, Bactrian camels and dromedaries).

The desert is well known for its deposits of gold, uranium, copper, aluminium and silver, natural gas and oil. The development of the most famous gold-field at Muruntau began in the early 1970s. The centres for the mining and smelting industry at the region are Navoi, Zarafshan, Uchkuduk. The major industrial enterprises are: НГМК (Navoi Mining and Smelting Complex) and the Uzbek U.S.A. Joint Venture "Zarafshan-Newmont". The centres of the gas-production industry are Gazli and Mubarek.

Gallery

See also
Andronovo culture
Aydar Lake, large artificial lake
Central Asian northern desert, an ecoregion largely corresponding with the Kyzylkum Desert
Karakum Desert, another desert of Central Asia
List of deserts by area
Sarmishsay, ancient monuments of anthropogenic activity

References

External links

 Slideshow: Across Central Asia’s Empty Core – Walking the caravan routes of the Kyzyl Kum desert

Deserts of Central Asia
Deserts of Kazakhstan
Deserts of Turkmenistan
Deserts of Uzbekistan
Ergs